The Water Is Wide is an album by jazz saxophonist Charles Lloyd recorded in December 1999 by Lloyd with Brad Mehldau, John Abercrombie, Larry Grenadier and Billy Higgins with Darek Oles guesting on one track. These tracks are among the last recorded by Higgins before his death in 2001. Additional tracks recorded at these sessions were released as Hyperion with Higgins in 2001.

Reception
The Allmusic review by David R. Adler awarded the album 4 stars calling it "a glorious amalgam of sound". The All About Jazz review by Glenn Astarita stated: "Charles Lloyd has rarely sounded better as the musicians seemingly interrogate each other’s souls during these sixty-eight enlightening minutes. Without a doubt, The Water Is Wide should find its way into quite a few top ten lists for the year 2000. Highly recommended". In another review for the same website C. Andrew Hovan stated "the chemistry is solid throughout, making Lloyd’s seventh ECM album particularly special".

Track listing
All compositions by Charles Lloyd except as indicated

 "Georgia" (Hoagy Carmichael, Stuart Gorrell) - 6:38  
 "The Water Is Wide" (Traditional) - 5:02  
 "Black Butterfly" (Duke Ellington, Irving Mills) - 4:36  
 "Ballade and Allegro" - 3:45
 "Figure in Blue" - 5:13  
 "Lotus Blossom" (Billy Strayhorn) - 5:39  
 "The Monk and the Mermaid" - 8:35  
 "Song of Her" (Cecil McBee) - 7:37  
 "Lady Day" - 7:29  
 "Heaven" (Ellington) - 4:15
 "There Is a Balm in Gilead" (Traditional) - 5:13  
 "Prayer" - 4:19

Personnel
Charles Lloyd – tenor saxophone
John Abercrombie – guitar
Brad Mehldau – piano
Larry Grenadier – bass
Billy Higgins – drums
Darek Oles – bass (track 12)

References

2000 albums
ECM Records albums
Charles Lloyd (jazz musician) albums
Albums produced by Manfred Eicher